Poole Town Football Club is a football club based in Poole, Dorset, England. The club was established in 1880 and they affiliated to the Dorset County Football Association and are a Football Association (FA) Charter Standard Community Club. The team spent two seasons in the National League South before relegation in 2018.

History

Origins
Poole FC were formed when two local teams, Poole Hornets and Poole Rovers, merged in 1890. Both teams had been in existence since 1880. Poole joined the Dorset League in 1896, then the Hampshire League in 1903. The club enjoyed success in the Dorset Senior Cup in their early years, winning it for the fifth time in 1907.

After several seasons without football because of the First World War, the club began playing again in the 1919–20 season under the name Poole & St. Marys. They changed their name back to Poole FC after one season. Poole joined the Western League in 1923.

Poole won the Dorset Senior Cup again in 1926. The club also turned professional that year and joined the Southern Football League, Eastern Division. The 1926–27 season saw the club's best FA Cup run in its history. They reached the third round and played Everton, losing 3–1 at Goodison Park. They won the Dorset Senior Cup again in 1927 and reached the First Round of the FA Cup three seasons in a row. Poole F.C. was unable to complete season 1929–30 in the Southern League due to financial difficulties and left four games unfulfilled. In May 1930 a deficit of £4261 was reported and the club went into voluntary liquidation.

Two weeks later a new club under the name of Poole Town FC was created. Poole rejoined the Western League in 1930 and stayed there (except for the 1934–35 season) until 1957.

Stadium
In 1933, Poole moved into Poole Stadium. They became known as Poole Town in 1934. Poole Town reached the First Round Proper of the FA Cup in 1946. They held Queens Park Rangers to a 2–2 draw before losing in the replay 6–0. They reached the first round again in 1963 and 1967, losing to Watford (after a replay) and Queens Park Rangers, respectively.  The Main Stand at Poole Stadium was built by Club supporters for the Football Club in the 1950s. In 1994 the Dog Track was widened making the center green too small for a regulation pitch. Poole Town were obliged to move on and find a new home.

Nomadic days
In 1994, having been forced to leave Poole Stadium to make way for Poole Pirates speedway and greyhound racing Poole Town shared a ground with Hamworthy United for the 1995–96 season. They lost 39 consecutive matches, equalling the record set by Stockport County in 1977, and winning just 1 point from 42 league matches. The record was subsequently beaten by A.F.C. Aldermaston in 2010. Poole Town were relegated from the Southern League and joined the Hampshire League Division One, sharing a ground with Holt United.

Poole won the Dorset Senior Cup for the 12th time in 1998. They also won the Hampshire League Cup and finished third in the league. They won the league cup again in 1999 and finished second in the league but were not promoted. The Hampshire League Premier Division was created for the 2000–01 season but Poole could not join because they did not have sufficient ground grading. They were effectively relegated, staying in the first division.

In 2000, they were promoted into the Hampshire League Premier Division. They moved into Haskells Rec in Newtown but left after a few seasons due to vandalism.

Tatnam
In October 2000, Poole began playing at Tatnam, the school field of Oakdale South Road Middle School (now Oakdale Junior School). They subsequently built a permanent barrier around the pitch, hardstanding, floodlights, dugouts, a small club shop, tea hut, licensed bar and an £80,000 stand which allowed them to be promoted into the Wessex League First Division.

In 2008, Poole Town submitted plans for the creation of a new £1.2 million ground at Branksome Recreation Ground which would enable them to meet strict FA criteria to gain promotion to the Southern League Division One. However, In December 2009 the Poole Borough Council Planning Committee turned the plans down due to loss of open space policy and no perceived community benefit. The club switched to plan B and have since won planning permission for a £2–3M development at Canford Magna, adjacent to Canford Park Arena. Although a privately funded 3G pitch was built on the Canford Land, no work has yet commenced for the new stadium.

The 2008–09 season saw Poole win the Wessex Premier title and Dorset Senior Cup (beating Dorchester 2–0 aet). Poole Town were the second best team of 1,600 Football Association clubs in England, based on points per match, with the following record: played 42, won 38, drawn 2, lost 2. They were, however, denied promotion due to inadequate ground grading at that time.

In the 2009–10 season Poole Town sold Charlie Austin to Swindon Town for an undisclosed sum.(estimated £180,000) Austin scored 46 goals in 46 games in his first season at Poole and 18 goals in 11 games before his transfer. He signed off with five goals in his last game against Moneyfields. Despite jumping six divisions, Austin continued scoring goals (eventually earning a transfer to Championship club Burnley and then Queens Park Rangers, playing at that time in the Premiership and with Charlie being one of the top scorers for the 2014–15 season). The 2009–10 season ended for Poole with another Wessex title but no promotion due to ground grading again.

During the 2010–11 season Poole Town won the Wessex League Premier Division for the third consecutive season and reached the semi-final of the FA Vase and the Fourth Qualifying Round of the FA Cup. In contrast to previous seasons, the club were granted promotion to the Southern League after FA agreed to them staging Southern League football at Tatnam following a temporary upgrade of the facilities.

The 2012–13 season saw the club promoted as champions of Southern League Division One South and West to the Premier division. The club completed a treble that season by winning the Dorset Senior Cup when they beat Wimborne Town 4–1 in the final and the Southern League Champions Cup, beating Burnham away 0–1. The Dolphins were also voted the Southern League SWD1 club of the season.

The 2013–14 season saw Poole miss out on the playoffs by just one point, having had three points deducted for playing an ineligible player during one match earlier in the season. The 2014–15 season saw Poole Town win the (Red Insure) Southern League Cup, beating Corby in the two legged final (on away goals). However, Corby had the last laugh as Poole missed out on the Championship on the last day of the season losing 2–3 at home to Corby who were second at the start of play on goal difference. The game was watched by a Tatnam record 2,203 crowd. The match had been billed as "Winner takes all" and the defeat consigned Poole to the Playoffs, where they lost in the semi-final at home to St Neots Town.

Tatnam was upgraded again in 2013 with the dugouts moved opposite the Main Stand, a new clubhouse, a third turnstile, 100 more seats including 50 in the small stand (which was moved), increased sizes for the dressing rooms, more toilets and a new changing facility for the officials, as well as a new stand at the Fleetsbridge End. The total upgrade cost over £200,000 and was completed in just over two months. The grading allows promotion to the National League South which they achieved at the end of the 2015–16 season.

Poole immediately competed near the top of the National League South in their first season, but were dealt a blow as they were ruled ineligible for promotion due to a lack of 500 covered seats in their stadium. Poole went on to finish fifth, which would have otherwise qualified for the playoffs. Poole then struggled throughout the 2017-18 season, and found themselves on the final day as one of two teams fighting to stave off the final drop spot—along with the other team also passed over for the previous season's playoffs, Hungerford Town.  A 2–0 Poole over Oxford City victory gave them hope, but ultimately Hungerford's narrow 1–0 win at East Thurrock United meant relegation back down to the Southern League South for the 2018–19 season.

Ground
Poole Town play their games at Tatnam Ground on School Lane, Poole.

The club continues to explore alternative ground locations. Reports suggest a possible return to Poole Stadium, but there is no official announcement on this matter.

Players

Current squad

Honours

League honours
 Southern League Premier Division:
 Winners (1): 2015–16
 Runners-up (1): 2014–15
 Southern League Division One :
 Runners-up (1): 1961–62
 Southern League Division One South :
 Runners-up (1): 1989–90
 Southern League Division One South & West:
 Winners (1): 2012–13
 Runners-up (1): 2011–12
 Western League :
 Winners (1): 1956–57
 Runners-up (4): 1946–47, 1949–50, 1953–54, 1955–56
 Wessex League Premier Division :
 Winners (3): 2008–09, 2009–10, 2010–11
 Wessex League Division Two:
 Runners-up (1): 2004–05
 Hampshire League Premier Division:
 Runners-up (2): 1998–99, 2000–01
 Hampshire League Division One:
 Winners (1): 1999–00

Cup honours
 Dorset Senior Cup:
 Winners (17): 1894–95, 1896–97, 1898–99, 1901–02, 1903–04, 1906–07, 1925–26, 1926–27, 1937–38, 1946–47, 1974–75, 1988–89, 1997–98, 2008–09, 2012–13, 2013–14, 2018–19, 2021-22
 Runners-up (19): 1890–91, 1892–93, 1895–96, 1897–98, 1899–00, 1900–01, 1910–11, 1927–28, 1932–33, 1936–37, 1948–49, 1950–51, 1961–62, 1987–88, 1992–93, 1993–94, 1994–95, 2003–04, 2005–06
 Western Football League Cup:
 Winners (1): 1954–55
 Wessex League Cup:
 Runners-up (1): 2009–10
 Trophyman Cup:
 Winners (2): 1997–98, 1998–99
 Southern League Champions Cup:
 Winners (1): 2012–13
 Southern League Cup (Red Insure):
 Winners (1): 2014–15

Records
 Highest (old) league position: 16th Southern League Premier Division – 1966–67 
 Highest (recent) league position: 5th National League South - 2016-2017
 Lowest league position: 1st Hampshire League Division One 
 Best FA Cup run: 3rd Round Proper – 1926 
 FA Trophy best performance: First Round 1969–70, 1970–71, 1974–75, 1987–88
 FA Vase best performance: Semi-final 2010–11
 Largest home crowd (Poole Stadium): 6,575 vs Watford in the FA Cup 1st round replay – 1963 
 Largest home crowd (Tatnam Ground): 2,203 vs Corby Town – 2014–15
 Biggest home win: 10–0 vs Horndean – 2009 
 Biggest away win: 11–0 vs Horndean – 1998 
 Record transfer fee (Paid): Nicky Dent (£5,000) – 1990 
 Record transfer fee (Received): Charlie Austin (Undisclosed – est. £180,000) – 2009

Supporters
Poole Town were one of the top seven best supported teams in the Southern Premier League with the highest League attendance of the 2014–15 season with 2,203 finishing the season with an average of 458 across all League games.
The official mascot is Dylan The Dolphin.

Notable former players
 Charlie Austin

Super Leigh Phillips

References

External links
 Official website
 Profile from official Southern League website
 Pyramid Passion ground profile
 

Wessex Football League
Association football clubs established in 1880
Sport in Poole
Southern Football League clubs
National League (English football) clubs
Football clubs in Dorset
1880 establishments in England
Football clubs in England